Peter William Neyroud CBE QPM (born 12 August 1959) is a retired British police officer. He was the Chief Executive Officer for the National Policing Improvement Agency (NPIA), and former Chief Constable of Thames Valley Police.  He announced his retirement from the NPIA in March 2010.

Neyroud was educated at Winchester College and Oriel College, Oxford, where he studied Modern History.  He holds an MSc in Professional Studies (Crime and Policing), a diploma in Applied Criminology and a PhD in Criminology (Wolfson College, Cambridge: 2018).

Peter Neyroud joined Hampshire Constabulary in 1980, rising through the ranks within Hampshire to Detective Superintendent. He was appointed Assistant Chief Constable of West Mercia Constabulary in 1998 and reached Deputy Chief Constable two years later. He was appointed Chief Constable of Thames Valley Police in 2002.

His position within the National Policing Improvement Agency (NPIA) was announced by the then Home Secretary Charles Clarke in October 2005, taking up the post as the CEO (Designate) in January 2006. The NPIA was operational from 1 April 2007 until 2012, when the Agency was closed and its training and research functions transferred to the College of Policing, which was set up following the recommendations of Neyroud’s Review of Police Training and Leadership which was commissioned by Home Secretary Theresa May and published in 2011.

Peter Neyroud was awarded the Queen's Police Medal for services to the police in 2004 and is a widely published author on policing. He was appointed Commander of the Order of the British Empire (CBE) in the 2011 Birthday Honours.

He is currently a lecturer in Evidence-Based Policing at the Institute of Criminology of the University of Cambridge.

References

People educated at West Downs School
Alumni of Oriel College, Oxford
British Chief Constables
English recipients of the Queen's Police Medal
Living people
People educated at Winchester College
1959 births
Commanders of the Order of the British Empire